The Appalachian State–Georgia Southern football rivalry, also known as Deeper Than Hate, is a college rivalry between the Mountaineers of Appalachian State University in Boone, North Carolina, and the Eagles of Georgia Southern University in Statesboro, Georgia. Despite being located in separate states, the two universities have similar academic profiles, both having developed from teachers' colleges, and having enrollments of approximately 20,000. In addition, both Appalachian and Georgia Southern historically held a very strong presence during their time in the Division I Football Championship Subdivision, having combined to win nine national championships, four Walter Payton Awards, and two Buck Buchanan Awards. On March 27, 2013, both schools were invited to join the Sun Belt Conference of the Football Bowl Subdivision (FBS) beginning in 2014.

Appalachian State leads the all-time series, 20–16–1. The rivalry has been played annually since 1993, well before both programs joined the Sun Belt (and the FBS) in 2014.

History
Georgia Southern's football program began in 1924 while the program at Appalachian began in 1928. The Eagles and Mountaineers first met in 1932, with South Georgia Teachers College beating Appalachian State Teachers College 33–0. In 1941, Georgia Southern discontinued its football program, and it wasn't until 1982 before the Eagles again took the field. The makings of the rivalry truly began when the Mountaineers beat the Eagles in the quarterfinals of the 1987 I-AA Playoffs. Georgia Southern returned the favor in 2001.

Game results

See also
List of NCAA college football rivalry games

Notes

References

College football rivalries in the United States
Appalachian State Mountaineers football
Georgia Southern Eagles football